Halsten Stenkilsson, English exonym: Alstan (Old Icelandic: Hallstein) was a king of Sweden, son of King Stenkil and a Swedish princess. He became king some time after his father Stenkil's death (1066), and he may have ruled together with his brother Inge the Elder. 
The date of his death is not known.

Brief kingship

Little is known of his time as king. In a scholia in the work of Adam of Bremen, he is reported to have been elected king after the violent death of two pretenders, but took over a highly volatile situation. While he was clearly a Christian like his father and brother, his influence may have been limited, since Adam relates that Christianity was so disturbed that the bishops appointed by the Archdiocese of Bremen did not even dare to travel to Sweden. He was deposed after a short while, in the late 1060s or early 1070s, and replaced by a princeling from Gardariki, Anund.

Possible later reign

That he later on ruled together with his brother Inge has some support from a papal letter from 1081, by Pope Gregory VII, which refers to two kings with the initials A and I, and where they are called kings of Västergötland (rege wisigothorum). However, the king "A" could also be Håkan the Red. His co-rulership with his brother Inge is also mentioned in the Hervarar saga. In the regnal list of the Westrogothic law, he is said to have been courteous and cheerful, and whenever a case was submitted to him, he judged fairly, and this was why Sweden mourned his death. He was the father of the co-rulers Philip and Inge the Younger.

The Hervarar saga, which is one of the few sources about the kings of this time, has the following  to tell:

Notes and references

11th-century Swedish monarchs
Kings of the Geats
House of Stenkil
1050s births
Year of birth uncertain
Year of death unknown
Sons of kings